Vannes Olympique Club (commonly referred to as simply Vannes) is a French football club based in Vannes. The club was formed in 1998 as a result of the merger of Véloce vannetais founded in 1911 and FC Vannes known before 1991 as UCK Vannes founded in 1946 and currently play in Championnat National 2, the fourth level of French football. Vannes plays its home matches at the Stade de la Rabine located within the city.

In 2002, the club hired Stéphane Le Mignan as manager, reaching the quarter-finals of the Coupe de France in 2007, the Championnat National title in 2008, the Coupe de la Ligue final in 2009 and three seasons of Ligue 2 from 2008 to 2011. He was dismissed in 2012 and the club filed for bankruptcy in 2014, reforming in the seventh tier and achieving three promotions in four years.

History 
In November 2002, after dismissing Denis Goavec, Vannes hired recently retired player Stéphane Le Mignan as manager. The team achieved promotion from the fourth-tier Championnat de France Amateur to the Championnat National under him in 2005, In the 2006–07 Coupe de France, Vannes won 2–0 after extra time in the last 16 away to Ligue 2 team Montpellier, then lost 5–0 at Ligue 1 Marseille in the quarter-finals.

Vannes won the 2007–08 Championnat National to earn promotion to Ligue 2 for the first time. This also meant a debut campaign in the Coupe de la Ligue, beating top-flight Valenciennes, Auxerre and Nice before a 4–0 final loss to Bordeaux at the Stade de France. In the 2010–11 Ligue 2, the team were relegated in 18th place on the final day, and the budget for the following season was thereby reduced from €8.5 million to €4 million, resulting in 14 players being released. On 27 December 2012, after over a decade in charge, Le Mignan was dismissed with the team 7th in the third tier, six points off Poiré-sur-Vie in third.

In June 2014, after narrowly avoiding relegation from the third tier, Vannes filed for bankruptcy, reforming in the Brittany Region Division Supérieure Elite in the seventh. The team won the regional Division d'Honneur in 2016 to reach the fifth level and return to national football, winning the renamed Championnat National 3 in 2017–18.

Players

Current squad

Notable former players 
For a list of former Vannes players, see :Category:Vannes OC players.

Honours 
Coupe de la Ligue
Runners-up: 2008–09
Championnat National
Winners: 2007–08
Championnat de France Amateur
Winners: 2003–04
Division d'Honneur (Brittany)
Winners: 1998, 2016
Division Supérieure Elite (Brittany)
Winners: 2015

References 

 
Association football clubs established in 1998
1998 establishments in France
Football clubs in Brittany